Askar Alakbar oghlu Abdullayev (1 January 1927, Eyvazli village, Gubadli district, Azerbaijan SSR – 15 April 1998, Baku, Azerbaijan) was a Soviet and Azerbaijani electrical engineer, scientist, doctor of technical sciences (1969), the USSR State Prize laureate (1969), corresponding member of the Academy of Sciences of the Azerbaijan SSR (1969), professor (1970), the USSR Council of Ministers Prize laureate (1988).

Biography 
Abdullayev was born on January 1, 1927 in the village of Eyvazli, Gubadli district, Azerbaijan SSR. He graduated from high school in 1943. In 1949 he graduated from the Energy Department of the Azerbaijan Industrial Institute. After a short work at the Institute of Power Engineering of the Academy of Sciences of the Azerbaijan SSR, he started postgraduate studies at the Institute of Automation and Telemechanics (IAT) of the USSR Academy of Sciences supervised by M. A. Aizerman.
In 1953 he defended his Ph.D. thesis on the automation of oil production in compressor wells and worked for the IAT as a junior researcher for a year. He was a member of the CPSU since 1953. In 1954, Abdullayev headed the laboratory of automation and telemechanics under the AZINMASH Institute of Petroleum Engineering and initiated the works on integrated automation in the oil fields of Azerbaijan. Since 1956 he was senior researcher. In 1957-1959, he became deputy director, and in 1959-1985, director of the research and design institute (RDI) “Neftekhimavtomat”. In 1985-1994, he became Director General of the Scientific and Production Association (SPA) “Neftgazavtomat” within RDI “Neftekhimavtomat” (parent organization), Ali-Bayramli (present Shirvan) plants of equipment “Pribori”, “Industrial Automation and Telemechanics”, Baku plant “Geofizpribor”.

He died on April 15, 1998, Baku, Azerbaijan.

Scientific activity 
Scientific achievements of Abdullaev are represented in 19 books and brochures, more than 200 articles and 70 inventions. He reported at international conferences, including in the USA (Boston – 1975, Alaska – 1987), the Netherlands (The Hague) – 1977, Hungary (Budapest) – 1982.

The Deputy Minister of Instrument Engineering of Automation and Control Systems of the USSR E.B.Smirnov stated: “The works by A. A. Abdullaev enriched the theory and practice of automation of control in the oil and gas industry, laid the foundations for a systematic multi-level and multi-circuit approach to the automatization of the oil industry based on a unified technical , information and organizational support.”

V. A. Trapeznikov (academician, honorary director of the Institute of Control Problems) and I. V. Prangishvili (academician of the Academy of Sciences of the GSSR, director of the Institute of Control Problems) mentioned that “he and his scientific school founded general principles for controlling the processing of
hydrocarbon raw materials, developed a new trend, i.e., structural adaptation in assessing the parameters of models of technological control objects”; “he established theoretical foundations for building automated control systems for associations and oil production enterprises and created information and control complexes. He developed theoretical and practical foundations of automation and control of objects of transport and storage of oil and oil products.”

Scientific and pedagogical activity 
Abdullaev supervised more than 40 PhDs in technical sciences, several doctors of sciences. He lectured at AzINEFTEXIM (Azerbaijan State Oil and Industrial University), prepared a textbook on the theory of automated control.

Titles, degrees and awards 
	1953 – PhD in technical sciences
	1966 – Order of the Badge of Honor
	1969 – the USSR State Prize Laureate for participation (as a manager) in the creation and widespread implementation of systems and a set of tools for automating the oil fields in Azerbaijan
	1969 – Doctor of Technical Sciences
	1969 – Corresponding Member of the Academy of Sciences of the Azerbaijan SSR
	1970 – Professor of the Academy of Sciences of the Azerbaijan SSR
	1970 – Medal “For labor Valour”
	1971 – Order of the “Red Banner of Labor”
	1972 – Honored Engineer of the Azerbaijan SSR
	1976 – Order of the October Revolution
	1988 – The USSR Council of Ministers Prize Laureate

Memory 
In late 2007, on the occasion of the eightieth anniversary of the birth of A.A.Abdullayev, the Baku publishing house “Nauka” published a bibliographic book Askar Abdullayev – 80 in the series "Azerbaijani figures of science and culture".

References 

1927 births
1998 deaths
People from Qubadli District
Azerbaijani scientists
Soviet scientists
Azerbaijani engineers
Soviet engineers